Platysace deflexa, known by its Noongar name youlk or as Ravensthorpe radish, is a small shrub endemic to the south west of Western Australia.

Description
The perennial shrub grows to around 20cm to 50cm high, and spreads to around 1 metre in diameter.  White flowers appear in summer.  Youlk is tolerant of a range of soil conditions, including nutrient-poor sandy locations, with its native range covering the southern areas from Albany in the west, to Ravensthorpe and Esperance in the east.  Tubers similar in appearance to a kipfler potato grow from the underground roots, with the one plant continuing to grow new tubers through its lifespan.

Uses
Like to the related Platysace maxwellii which grows in areas further north, the edible tubers of the plant are a traditional food source of the indigenous Noongar people of Western Australia.  The tubers can be harvested throughout the year and, similarly to sweet potato, the plant will continue to grow more as long as the main plant and suckers aren't over-harvested.

The youlk tubers can be used similarly to potatoes, with a crisp texture. Some commercial growers have begun experimenting with growing youlk on a commercial basis, including indigenous community-run businesses. As of 2019, youlk plants are also available for purchase from garden centres in Western Australia.

References

deflexa
Flora of Western Australia
Noongar culture
Endemic flora of Australia
Root vegetables
Bushfood